The surname Tobias derives from the Greek form (Τοβίας) of the Hebrew male given name "Tovya" טוביה, meaning "God is good". In the Old Testament of the Bible, Tobias is the hero of the Book of Tobit who defeats a demon with archangel Raphael’s help. 

The surname Tobias may refer to the following people:
Andrew Tobias (born 1947), American journalist and writer
Channing Heggie Tobias (1882–1961), American civil rights activist
Charles Tobias (1898–1970), American songwriter
Donna Tobias (1952-2010), American diver
Douglas Tobias, American chemist
Errol Tobias (born 1950), South African rugby union player
Fred Tobias, American songwriter
George Tobias (1901–1980), American actor
George Tobias, Anglican bishop
Gert Tobias (born 1973), Romanian artist
Harry Tobias (1895–1994), American songwriter
Herbert Tobias (1924–1982), German photographer 
Isabella Tobias (born 1991), American ice dancer 
Jenny Kendall-Tobias (born 1967), British radio journalist
Jesse Tobias (born 1972), American guitarist
John Tobias (born 1969), American graphic artist and video game designer
Ken Tobias (born 1945), Canadian singer and songwriter
Manoel Tobias (born 1971), Brazilian futsal player
Marc Tobias, Venezuelan-American locksmith
Michael Tobias (born 1951), American environmentalist and filmmaker
Murray Tobias (born 1939), Australian judge
Nataliya Tobias (born 1980), Ukrainian runner
Oliver Tobias (born 1947), British actor
Paul Tobias (born 1963), American guitarist
Pavel Tobiáš (born 1955), Czech football player and manager
Phillip V. Tobias (1925–2012), South African palaeoanthropologist
Randall L. Tobias (born 1942), former CEO of Eli Lilly and Company, and first United States Global AIDS Coordinator
Rudolf Tobias (1873–1918), Estonian composer
Seth Tobias (1963–2007), American businessman
Szidi Tobias (born 1967), Slovak actress and musician
Timothy J. Tobias (1952–2006), American composer
Todd Tobias (born 1967), American musician and record producer
Uwe Tobias (born 1973), Romanian artist

References